Roger Perdrix (born June 17, 1943) was a Canadian football player who played for the Ottawa Rough Riders. He won the Grey Cup in 1968, 1969, and 1973. He previously played college football at the University of Cincinnati.

References

1943 births
Living people
American football offensive linemen
Canadian football offensive linemen
American players of Canadian football
Cincinnati Bearcats football players
Ottawa Rough Riders players
Sportspeople from Boston
Players of American football from Massachusetts